A mukim is a type of administrative division used in Brunei, Indonesia, Malaysia and Singapore. The word mukim is a loanword in English. However, it was also originally a loanword in Malay from the Arabic word:  (meaning resident). The closest English translation for mukim is township.

Usage

Brunei

In Brunei, a mukim is the immediate subdivision of a district. The equivalent English word for 'mukim' is 'township'.
There are 38 mukims in Brunei. Each mukim is an administrative area made up of several  (Malay for "village"). The number of mukims in each of the districts in Brunei is as follows:

The smallest mukim by area is Mukim Saba in the Brunei-Muara District.  The largest mukim by area is Mukim Sukang in the Belait District.  The last change in the mukim boundaries was in the late 1990s when Mukim Kumbang Pasang was merged into Mukim Kianggeh and Mukim Berakas was divided into Mukim Berakas A and Mukim Berakas B. The number of mukims remained at 38.

Indonesia 
In Indonesia,  means 'a place to stay' or 'the one who stays', while  means 'a settlement'. The term mukim is used only in Aceh as a subdivision of a district. A mukim contains several villages.

Malaysia 
However, in Putrajaya the designation  is not used; the term  (Malay for "precinct") is used instead. The northern state of Perlis, due to its small size, is not divided into , but directly into . In Kelantan, the term  corresponds to the  level in other states.

Singapore 
In Singapore, a Mukim is a survey district. There are 34 Mukim survey districts in Singapore, as well as 30 Town Subdivision survey districts. The Town Subdivision survey districts are located in the city area, while the Mukim survey districts are located in the outer regions surrounding the former.

See also
Divisions of Malaysia
Administrative divisions of Brunei
Barangay/Barrio
Raion/Uyezd/Powiat
Sanjak

References 

Types of administrative division
Subdivisions of Brunei
Malay words and phrases